This is a list of gliders/sailplanes of the world, (this reference lists all gliders with references, where available) 
Note: Any aircraft can glide for a short time, but gliders are designed to glide for longer.

W

W.W.S.
(Wojskowe Warsztaty Szybowcowe – military glider workshops)
 W.W.S.1 Salamandra
 W.W.S.2 Żaba (Frog)
 W.W.S.3 Delfin (Dolphin)

Waco
 Waco CG-3A
 Waco CG-4A
 Waco CG-13A
 Waco CG-15
 Waco Primary
 Northwestern PG-1 (CG-4)
 Ridgefield PG-2 (CG-4)
 Waco PG-3 (CG-15)
 Waco LRW (CG-4)
 Waco LR2W USN transport glider

Wagener
(H. Wagener)
 Wagener H.F.V. 17 Pirat

Waibel-Butler
(Gerhard Waibel & Dick Butler & Loek Boermans & Johannes Dillinger)
 Waibel-Butler Concordia

Walker
(Sam Walker)
 Walker Aria

Wallisa
(Józef Walis)
 Wallisa S-I (Willis S.1 or Walis S-1)  No.18 – Second Polish Glider Contest 17 May – 15 June 1925
 Wallisa S-III No.19 – Second Polish Glider Contest 17 May – 15 June 1925

Walters
(Fred Walters)
 Walters Sinbad I

Walther
(Don Walther of Christchurch, New Zealand )
 Walther Boffin-Coffin

Warczewski
(J. Warczewski – No.16 – Second Polish Glider Contest 17 May – 15 June 1925)
 Mechanik (glider) (Mechanic)

Warner
(Martin Warner & Allan J. Campbell)
 Warner Brolga
 Warner Kite 2
 Warner-Campbell Kite 1

Warszawa Uczniów Gymnazjum
(Chrzanowski-Gymnasiums in Warszawa)
 Warszawa Uczniów Gymnazjum glider

Wassmer
(Ets. Benjamin Wassmer / Wassmer Aviation SA)
 Wassmer WA 20 Javelot
 Wassmer WA 21 Javelot II
 Wassmer WA 22 Super Javelot
 Wassmer WA 22 Super Javelot 64
 Wassmer WA-22-28
 Wassmer WA-23
 Wassmer WA 26 Squale
 Wassmer WA 26 CM Squale Marfa
 Wassmer WA 28 Espadon
 Wassmer WA 30 Bijave
 Wassmer KBK-10
 Wassmer-SIREN H-230

Watson-Northrop
(J.P. Watson & Jack Northrop)
 Watson-Northrop 1929 glider

Weber
(Ernst Weber)
 Weber EW-1 – ANDRÖS, & MÜLLER
 Weber EW-2
 Weber EW-3 Libelle
 Weber EW-18
 Weber 108-16 RLM designation for EW-2

Weber
(Günther Weber - East Germany [DDR - Deutsches Demokratische Republik])
 Weber We-3 1971
 Weber We-4 1964

Weber-Landholf-Münch
 Weber-Landholf-Münch WLM-1
 Weber-Landholf-Münch WLM-2

Weiss
(José Weiss)
 Weiss 1914 glider
 Weiss Joker
 Weiss Olive

Weltensegler
(Weltensegler G.m.b.H)
 Weltensegler Feldberg aka Strandpromenade ?)
 Weltensegler Baden-Baden Stolz

Wenham
 Wenham Multiplane 1858

Westmacott
(R. J. Westmacott & K. Westmacott)
 Westmacott Skylark

Wezel 
(Martin Wezel Flugzeugtechnik)
 Wezel Viva
 Wezel Apis 2

Whigham
(Eugene Whigham)
 Whigham GW-1
 Whigham GW-2
 Whigham GW-3
 Whigham GW-4
 Whigham GW-5
 Whigham GW-6
 Whigham GW-7

Whisper
(Whisper Aircraft)
 Whisper Motor Glider

Whitehead
(Gustave Whitehead, née Weiskopf)
 Whitehead 1897 glider

Widmaier
(Kuno Widmaier / IPE - Industria Paranaense de Estruturas)
 Widmaier GB-1 Quero
 Widmaier KW-1 Quero Quero
 Widmaier KW-2 Biguá

Widmer
(Hans Widmer / Matheus Avallone Sobrinho & Kurt Hendrich)
 Widmer HW-4 Flamengo (Flamingo)

Wiederkehr 
 Wiederkehr GHW-1 Cu-Climber
 Wiederkehr GHW-2

Wiesner
(Jaroslav  Wiesner)
 Wiesner Schrudim

Wikner
(Geoffrey Neville Wikner)
 Wikner Golden Sparrow
 Wikner-Lindner Secondary

Wilkes
 Wilkes BMW-1

Wilkinson
 Wilkinson Mk 1
 Wilkinson Mk 2

Wimmer-Dewald
(Josef Immer & Alexander Dewald)
 Wimmer-Dewald Leonardo 2000

Wind
(Willy Wind)
 Wind Wi-1

Windward Performance 
(Greg Cole)
 Windward Performance Perlan II
 Windward Performance SparrowHawk
 Windward Performance DuckHawk
 Windward Performance JetHawk
 Windward Performance GosHawk

Wishart
(Alfred William Wishart)
 Wishart 1930 glider
 Wishart Biplane glider

WLM
(WLM Flugingenieure / Rudolf Sägesser / Isler & Co, Wildegg / H. Sägesser, Flugzeugbbau, Herzogenbuchsee)
 WLM-1
 WLM-2

Wright 
(Peter W. Wright)
 Wright Micron
 Wright MPA – man powered aircraft
 Wright Falcon

Wright Bros. 
(Wilbur & Orville Wright)
 Wright 1900
 Wright 1901
 Wright 1902
 Wright IV 1911

WS
(Warsztaty Szybowcowe – glider workshops)
 WS SG-3
 WS SG-7
 WS SG-21 Lwów
 WS SG-28
  WS Wrona
 WS Komar
 WS Sroka
 WS Sokol
 WS Mewa
 WS Orlik

WWS
(Wiegand und Wisser Sportflugzeugbau GmbH & Co. KG)
 WWS WM-1

Notes

Further reading

External links

Lists of glider aircraft